Thyrostipa is a genus of moths of the family Erebidae. The genus was erected by George Hampson in 1926.

Species
Thyrostipa chekiana Draudt, 1950 China (Anhui)
Thyrostipa sphaeriophora (Moore, 1867) Bengal

References

Calpinae
Noctuoidea genera